NHL Open Ice: 2 on 2 Challenge, or just NHL Open Ice, is an ice hockey arcade game released by Midway Games in 1995. It features comically exaggerated hockey play, causing it to often be described as an ice hockey equivalent to Midway's NBA Jam. It was ported to the PlayStation in 1996. The is near identical to its arcade counterpart with exception to the fact that the Winnipeg Jets moved to Phoenix after the conclusion of the 1995–96 season, thus the Phoenix Coyotes replaced the Jets in the PlayStation port.

NHL Open Ice was released on PC (Windows) in 1996-1997 featuring the same roster and teams as the PlayStation version. The game is an official licensed product of the NHLPA (National Hockey League Players Association).

Development
Jack Haeger was lead game designer and an avid hockey player. The lead programmer was Mark Penacho, assisted by Bill Dabelstein. Sound design and music by Jon Hey. The skating sounds were recorded by Jon Hey at the Chicago Park District's only indoor ice rink, McFetridge Sports Center, which is just a block North of what was once Midway's Chicago studios. The announcer in the game is the famous voice of the Chicago Blackhawks Pat Foley. If a team achieves "On-Fire" status (made famous initially by Midway's NBA Jam), Pat Foley's voice will occasionally announce: "Toasty", a reference to Mortal Kombat. A version of NHL Open Ice for Panasonic M2 was in development and slated to be one of the launch titles but it never occurred due to the system's cancellation.

Reception

Reviewing the arcade version, Next Generation called the game "NBA Jam on ice", and said it would be particularly appreciated since arcade hockey games were almost unheard of at the time. They applauded the game's full NHL licensing and player rosters, flaming pucks, two-on-two mode, commentary, and overall depth and playability of its hockey action, and concluded that "Williams rarely makes a bad move, and Open Ice is testament to its conservative but consistent quality games." Bruised Lee of GamePro similarly said the game "proves that Midway will continue to dominate the arcade sports market long after the success of NBA Jam." He praised the numerous Easter eggs, sharp graphics, fluid animation, and variety of moves. Brad Cook of AllGame called the same game "a must play for any hockey fan."

In 1996 the arcade version was placed on display in the Hockey Hall of Fame.

The PlayStation and PC versions divided reviewers. Jeff Kitts of GameSpot, The Rookie of GamePro, and Dean Hager of Electronic Gaming Monthly all agreed that it offered fun and fast NBA Jam-style hockey and was a faithful translation of the arcade version. Kitts acknowledged problems with the animations but praised the inclusion of novelty power-up codes, and judged the game an overall refreshing break from realistic hockey sims. The Rookie went so far as to say that it "shoots and scores at every level." In contrast, Hager's co-reviewer Kraig Kujawa said it "doesn't seem to capture the magic that made [NBA Jam] so popular", and that it compares poorly to its similar contemporary, Wayne Gretzky's 3D Hockey for the Nintendo 64. Next Generation agreed that it simply lacked the spark of NBA Jam, and also "fails to capture the coin-op's flashy essence", citing smaller characters, missing frames of animation, a weaker color palette, and missing audio effects compared to the arcade version. Official UK PlayStation Magazine said that players should "avoid the game at all costs."

Stephen Poole of GameSpot said of the PC version, "NHL Open Ice isn't the kind of game you'll play for hours on end, but it is the kind that you can fire up just about any time for 20 or 30 minutes of fun, or leave running at your next party for your guests to enjoy. Except for the graphics in the full-screen mode, they'll think they're at the arcade - and with a game like this, you can't ask any more than that."

See also
Hit the Ice
NHL Hitz (disambiguation)

Notes

References

External links

2 On 2 Open Ice Challenge at AllGame

1995 video games
Arcade video games
Avalanche Software games
Cancelled Panasonic M2 games
Windows games
PlayStation (console) games
Midway video games
National Hockey League video games
Video games developed in the United States
Video games scored by Jonathan Hey
Video games set in 1995
Video games set in 1996